City Council of Tampere (Finnish: Tampereen kaupunginvaltuusto) is the highest decision-making organ of Tampere. It consists on 67 members who're elected every four years in the municipal election.

The council meets at the Tampere City Central Office Building (sometimes called "The White House") in the city centre. The meetings take place almost always on Mondays. The meetings are sent on radio by Radio Moreeni.

The National Coalition Party and the Swedish People's Party have been in a local alliance since the municipal election of 2008. 

Peter Löfberg, Swedish People's Party, died while in office in May 2021.

Latest election 
Following the 2021 municipal election the Social democrats and the Coalition tied with 17 seats each. The NCP, however, received more votes and won by only 15 votes meaning their mayoral candidate, Anna-Kaisa Ikonen was nominated to the post.

References 

Tampere
Local government in Finland